The Niiname-sai (新嘗祭, also read Shinjō-sai and Niiname-no-Matsuri) is a Japanese harvest ritual.

The ritual is celebrated by the Emperor of Japan, who thanks the Shinto deities for a prosperous year and prays for a fruitful new year. It takes place near the Three Palace Sanctuaries of in the imperial palace and several large Shinto shrines.  The first Niiname-sai for a new emperor is known as the Daijō-sai (大嘗祭), and is part of his enthronement ceremonies.

In pre-modern Japan, the date of the Niiname-sai was moveable, taking place on the last Day of the Rabbit of the eleventh month of the old Japanese lunar calendar, but in the Meiji period the date was fixed at November 23, and this date became a national holiday, Labor Thanksgiving Day, in the Shōwa period after World War II.

Ceremony 
During the Niiname-sai, an ancient Shinto ritual that says thanks for the crops of the previous year and prays for fruitfulness in the following year, the Emperor of Japan says thanks to his gods. It is held in the Imperial Palace, as well as other shrines including Ise Grand Shrine and Izumo Shrine.

Date 
Traditionally, it was held on the last Day of the Rabbit in the eleventh month of the old lunar calendar.

Since the Meiji era the date has been fixed on November 23, which corresponds to the modern public holiday Labor Thanksgiving Day, which was introduced in 1948.

As a kigo, the name of the ritual is associated with winter.

Name 
Niiname-sai is the common name of the festival, but the same kanji can also be read Jinshō-sai or Niiname-no-Matsuri. Niiname can also be read Niinae, Niinai, Niwanai, Niwanami or Nyūnami.

The first Niiname-sai following the accession of a new emperor is called the Daijō-sai (大嘗祭, also read Ōname-Matsuri and Ōnie-no-Matsuri).

In literature 
Book 19 of the Man'yōshū includes six poems (numbered 4273 to 4278) composed on the 25th day of the eleventh month of 752, the "Niiname-kai poems". The "nyūnami" is alluded to in one of the azuma-uta (songs of eastern Japan) included in Book 14.

See Also 
 Japanese Imperial Rituals
 Saiten

References

Works cited 
 
 
 

Japanese Imperial Rituals
Shinto festivals
Harvest festivals